Paka (River of Blood) is a 2021 Indian Malayalam language drama film written and directed by Nithin Lukose. The film stars Basil Paulose in lead role while Vinitha Koshy, Nithin George, Abhilash Nair, Jose Kizhakkkan, Athul John, Joseph Manikkal and Mariyakkutty are in supporting roles. The film is produced by Raj Rachakonda and Anurag Kashyap. The film premiered at the 2021 Toronto International Film Festival in Discovery Section. It is also selected in the Red Sea International Film Festival as Part of Competition section- 2021.

Premise 
A couple in patriarchal rural Kerala decides to put an end to the cycle of vengeance by the banks of a river that has more blood in it than water. The bloodthirsty river bears witness to everything.

Production and release
The principal photography of the film was completed in February 2021 and post production works has done in the time of Covid -19 pandemic. The film got selected and premiered at the 2021 Toronto International Film Festival (TIFF) in Discovery Section.

Cast 
 Basil Paulose  as Johnny
 Vinitha Koshy  as Anna
 Nithin George as Joey
 Athul John as Paachi
 Jose Kizhakkkan as Kocheppu
 Abhilash Nair as Thankan
 Joseph Manikkal as Varkey
 Mariyakkutty as Grandmother
 Jose Ashariyott as Swimmer Jose

References

External links 
 

2021 films
2020s Malayalam-language films